is a Japanese footballer who plays for Oita Trinita.

Club statistics
Updated to 25 February 2019.

References

External links
Profile at Montedio Yamagata 

Profile at Vissel Kobe

1994 births
Living people
Kwansei Gakuin University alumni
Association football people from Hyōgo Prefecture
Japanese footballers
J1 League players
Vissel Kobe players
J2 League players
Montedio Yamagata players
Oita Trinita players
Association football midfielders